Snyderidia canina is a species of pearlfish found in all tropical waters but those of the eastern Pacific Ocean, depths from . This fish is the only known species in its genus which was named in honour of the ichthyologist John Otterbein Snyder (1867-1943) for the assistance he lent to Charles Henry Gilbert on the cruise to Hawaii on which the type specimen was collected.

References

Carapidae
Monotypic fish genera
Fish described in 1905